The Country Bears is a 2002 American musical road comedy film directed by Peter Hastings, produced by Walt Disney Pictures, and based on the Disney theme park attraction Country Bear Jamboree. The film stars Christopher Walken, Daryl Mitchell, Diedrich Bader (in a dual role), Alex Rocco, and Haley Joel Osment as the voice of Beary Barrington with the voice talents of Candy Ford, James Gammon, Brad Garrett, Toby Huss, Kevin Michael Richardson, and Stephen Root.

It was Disney's second theatrical film based on an attraction at one of its theme parks and the third overall film based on an attraction following the television film Tower of Terror (1997) and the theatrically released Mission to Mars (2000). Its world premiere was on July 21, 2002, at the El Capitan Theater in Hollywood, California. After that, it was released to theaters nationwide on July 26, 2002, and was a critical and commercial flop, grossing $18 million of its $35 million budget.

Plot

The Country Bears, an all-bear country rock band, disbanded in 1991 after years of popularity. Beary Barrington, a preteen bear adopted and raised by a human family, feels different. His adoptive parents tell him his family love him unconditionally and that differences lead everyone to their purposes. When Beary's adoptive older brother, Dex, tells him the truth about his background, Beary runs away and ventures out to the Country Bear Hall, the Country Bears' former concert hall. Beary learns from the caretaker Big Al and the band's manager Henry Dixen Taylor that Country Bear Hall is threatened with destruction by greedy banker Reed Thimple. After many attempts to save Country Bear Hall, Beary suggests that Henry hold a benefit concert, and the two set out to reunite the group with the band's bus driver and drummer, Roadie. The Barringtons enlist police officers Cheets and Hamm to find Beary.

First, they recruit Fred Bedderhead, the harmonica and electric bass player, who works as a security guard on the set of pop singer Krystal's latest music video. Henry needs promotion, and Beary suggests the group's former promoter Rip Holland, whom Henry claimed had "stolen" the Country Bears. Henry phones Rip, who gladly agrees to promote the show. Fred mentions a talent show history where they defeated an armpit musician named Benny Boggswaggle, who angrily struck Zeb Zoober. Thimple approaches Big Al and learns about the Country Bears' plan and about Holland promoting the show.

Next, they approach the band's fiddler Zeb Zoober, who has spent years drinking honey and owes a $500 bar tab. Zeb wants to return but must pay his debt. Beary places a bet to let Zeb off the hook by beating the house band in a playoff. Zeb starts his performance poorly but wins after warming up. Officer Cheets and Officer Hamm approach Big Al for directions to where Beary went. Because of miscommunication, the officers think the bears have kidnapped Beary.

Tennessee O'Neal, the one-string guitar player, is now a marriage counselor. He is very reluctant to rejoin the band because he wants to reconcile with his ex-girlfriend Trixie St. Claire, the band's keyboard player. After being chased by Officers Cheets and Hamm through a car wash, the Country Bears stop at a motel where Trixie St. Claire is performing. Tennessee sings a duet with her, and she comes with the band to their reunion.

They finally head out to find Ted Bedderhead, the lead vocalist and guitarist. They learn from Elton John that Ted, who appears very wealthy, is at a wedding at the local country club. After Ted has the other Country Bears members leave, Fred learns that he is only a wedding singer. Fred knocks out Ted and drags him onto the bus. Zeb claims Ted to be the reason for the band's disestablishment, but Ted claims he held them together. Ted says the real problem was Zeb's drinking, Tennessee's emotional outbursts, and Fred's immaturity. Beary reminds them that they claimed each other to be family, but Ted says it was meaningless publicity and tells him that he knows nothing about the real bears and that they are not a family. Beary realizes the real meaning of family and returns home, where he is happily reunited with his family.

The Country Bears read Beary's school essay about them and realize that Beary was right. Reconciling with Beary, Ted insists that they allow him to join them during the concert, but Thimple kidnaps the rest of the Country Bears and steals the bus. Thimple reveals he is really Benny Boggswaggle and seeks vengeance for stealing his chance at fame. Beary, his family and Ted track down and rescue the band, and they head to the concert together.

There, they discover that Thimple paid Rip to not promote the show. Big Al suddenly arrives and reveals, to everyone's surprise, that he promoted the show himself, and everyone is in a different parking lot. A surge of people rush in. Defeated, Thimple is thrown out of the building while vowing that his feud is not over. The money raised from the concert is enough to save the hall, and the Country Bears perform with Beary as a new member of the band.

Cast

Live action
 Christopher Walken as Reed Thimple, a banker and the main villain of the film, who plots to destroy the Country Bear Hall. He is actually a musician named Benny Bogswaggle who harbors ill will towards the Country Bears after losing a talent competition to them.
 Michael Lawrence Morgan as Young Benny Bogswaggle
 Stephen Tobolowsky as Mr. Norbert Barrington, Beary's honorable and good-natured adoptive father.
 Daryl Mitchell as Officer Hamm, an inept police officer
 Diedrich Bader as Officer Cheets, an inept police officer who wears a fake mustache.
 Alex Rocco as Rip Holland, the former promoter of the Country Bears.
 M.C. Gainey as Roadie, the bus driver for the Country Bears who also doubles as the band's drummer.
 Meagen Fay as Mrs. Norma Barrington, Beary's excitable, yet easily worried adoptive mother.
 Eli Marienthal as Dexter "Dex" Barrington, Beary's adoptive older brother.
 Jennifer Paige as Waitress
 Jess Harnell as Long-Haired Dude, one of the Bears' fans who was later seen with Dex in the audience at the end of the film.
 Paul Rugg as TV Reporter

Cameos
 Krystal as Herself
 Don Henley as Himself
 John Hiatt as Himself
 Sir Elton John as Himself, he is mistaken as Ted's gardener by the other Country Bears and has allowed Ted to bunk with him.
 Queen Latifah as Herself
 Latifah also plays "Cha Cha", the manager of the Swarming Hive Honey Bar restaurant.
 Willie Nelson as Himself
 Bonnie Raitt as Herself
 Brian Setzer as Himself
 Don Was as Himself
 Wyclef Jean as Himself
 Xzibit as Himself

Voice cast
 Haley Joel Osment as Beary Barrington, an optimistic bear cub who idolizes the Country Bears.
 Elizabeth Daily as Beary Barrington (singing voice)
 Diedrich Bader as Ted Bedderhead, the lead vocalist and guitarist of the Country Bears, and Fred's older brother.
 John Hiatt as Ted Bedderhead (singing voice)
 Candy Ford as Trixie St. Claire, the keyboardist and Tennessee's girlfriend who broke up with him to date a wealthy panda. She later rekindles her relationship with Tennessee upon the Country Bears getting back together.
 Bonnie Raitt as Trixie St. Claire (singing voice)
 James Gammon as Big Al, the sluggish and elderly property caretaker for the Country Bear Hall who is protective of the grass in front of the Country Bear Hall.
 Brad Garrett as Fred Bedderhead, the harmonica player and bassist of the band, and Ted's younger brother.
 Toby Huss as Tennessee O'Neal, the one-string guitar player in the band who's the most sensitive.
 Don Henley as Tennessee O'Neal (singing voice)
 Kevin Michael Richardson as Henry Dixon Taylor, the MC and manager of the Country Bears.
 Stephen Root as Zeb Zoober, the fiddle player for The Country Bears. He is the most naive of the band.

Puppeteers
 Alice Dinnean as Beary Barrington (facial assistant)
 Misty Rosas as Beary Barrington (in-suit performer)
 Michelan Sisti as Ted Bedderhead (facial assistant)
 Brian La Rosa as Ted Bedderhead (in-suit performer)
 Terri Hardin as Trixie St. Claire (facial assistant)
 Denise Cheshire as Trixie St. Claire (in-suit performer)
 Terri Hardin as Big Al (facial assistant)
 John Alexander as Big Al (in-suit performer)
 Allan Trautman as Fred Bedderhead (facial assistant)
 Kaepan Shaw as Fred Bedderhead (in-suit performer)
 Julianne Buescher as Tennessee O'Neal (facial assistant)
 Jody St. Michael as Tennessee O'Neal (in-suit performer)
 Bruce Lanoil as Henry Dixon Taylor (facial assistant)
Tom Fisher as Henry Dixon Taylor (in-suit performer)
 John Kennedy as Zeb Zoober (facial assistant)
 Tony Sabin Prince as Zeb Zoober (in-suit performer)

Some of the puppeteers made cameos in the movie;

 Buescher, St. Michael, and Hardin were seen at the Swarming Hive Honey Bar where Buescher played a waitress and St. Michael is seen as a patron with a tattoo of Tennessee on his arm (which was painted on him by Buescher).
 La Rosa and his wife Bess were seen as patrons at the hotel bar where Trixie was performing.

Production
Development began when Disney VP of Production Brigham Taylor took his family to Disneyland and decided the ride would make a good movie. Many within the company were skeptical of the concept, but Buena Vista Motion Pictures Group prexy Nina Jacobson was sold on the concept and immediately pushed the film into production with the blessing of then-Disney chairman Peter Schneider — a prime believer in all things synergistic. The movie was fast-tracked into production, both because of its low cost and to have releasable product on hand in the event of an impending writers strike.

The animatronic bear suits used in the film were created by Jim Henson's Creature Shop.

Principal photography began on March 15, 2001, and wrapped on August 21, 2001. It was filmed in Franklin, Tennessee as well as various locations in California. This was also Daryl Mitchell’s final film before he became a paraplegic from a motorcycle accident on November 10, 2001, eight months before the movie's premiere.

Soundtrack

The original music was composed by Christopher Young, and the songs were written by Brian Setzer, John Hiatt, Jimmy Tittle, Krystal Harris and Bela Fleck as well as Elton John.

Reception

Box office
Budgeted at US$35 million, it grossed $16,990,825 in the US and an additional $1,021,272 overseas. The film was released on DVD and VHS on December 17, 2002. Though filmed in 1.85:1 widescreen, Region 1 DVDs present the film in full screen only though Region 2 and 4 present the film in widescreen.

Critical response
On review aggregator Rotten Tomatoes, the film received a rating of 31% based on 85 reviews, with an average rating of 4.5/10. The site's critic consensus states: "Despite all the celebrities on hand, this spin-off from a theme park attraction still feels tired and hokey." On Metacritic, the film has a weighted average score of 37 out of 100, based on 21 critics, which indicates "generally negative reviews". Audiences polled by CinemaScore gave the film an average grade of "A-" on an A+ to F scale.

Film critic Roger Ebert gave the film a two out of four stars and said, "the formidable technical skills in The Country Bears must not be allowed to distract from the film's terminal inanity." Emma Cochrane of Empire Magazine gave the film a two out of five stars and said, "Too American, too country, too much like a slick, band extension cash-in, Country Bears hovers between cult video hit and utter rubbish, never being compellingly either."

Christopher Walken was nominated for a Golden Raspberry Award for Worst Supporting Actor for his performance in the film, but lost to Hayden Christensen for Star Wars: Episode II – Attack of the Clones.

Cancelled sequel
Prior to the film's release, a sequel was announced to be in development. Following the critical and commercial underperformance of the film the sequel was cancelled.

References

External links

2002 films
2000s buddy comedy films
2000s musical comedy films
American buddy comedy films
American musical comedy films
Films scored by Christopher Young
Films based on amusement park attractions
Films about bears
Films about animals
Puppet films
Films set in 2002
Films set in Tennessee
American films about revenge
Walt Disney Pictures films
2002 directorial debut films
2002 comedy films
American road comedy-drama films
2000s road comedy-drama films
Musical comedy-drama films
2000s musical comedy-drama films
American musical comedy-drama films
American children's comedy films
Cultural depictions of Elton John
2000s English-language films
2000s American films